JPS may refer to:

Businesses and organizations 
 Jamestown Public Schools (disambiguation)
 Japan Pension Service
 Japan Photographic Society (19th century)
 Japan Photographic Society (1924–)
 Japan Professional Photographers Society
 Jefferson Pilot Sports, now called Lincoln Financial Sports, a sports production company
 Jewish Publication Society
 Jewish Publication Society of America Version, an English-language Bible translation from 1917
 New Jewish Publication Society of America Tanakh (JPS Tanakh), an English-language Bible translation from 1985
 Independent Jewish Press Service (active in the 1940s)
 John Peter Smith Hospital in Fort Worth, Texas, United States
 John Player & Sons, a former cigarette manufacturer
 John Player Special, a British and Canadian cigarette brand
 Jyväskylän Seudun Palloseura, a Finnish sport club
 Physical Society of Japan

Schools and school districts 
 J. P. Stevens High School, in Middlesex County, New Jersey, United States
 Jackson Public School District, in Mississippi, United States
 Jackson Public Schools (Michigan), in the United States
 Jonesboro Public Schools, in Arkansas, United States

Other uses 
 JPEG Stereoscopic, a 3D image format
 JPS Experience, a rock band
 John Paul Stevens, Associate Justice of the Supreme Court of the United States (1975-2010)
 Jump point search, a routing algorithm

See also
 JP (disambiguation)